Aftershock is a 2012 Chilean-American disaster horror film directed by Nicolás López and starring Eli Roth. It was written by López, Roth, and Guillermo Amoedo, from a story by Roth and López.

Plot
Gringo, Ariel, and Pollo meet Hungarian sisters Monica and Kylie and their Russian friend Irina at a club in Chile. They decide to travel together to Valparaíso but during a party at another club, an earthquake strikes, trapping them under debris. Ariel loses his hand trying to help a trapped bartender, and they struggle to escape until a cleaning lady guides them through a tunnel to a manhole. Unfortunately, a passing truck kills the old lady as they try to climb out.

After escaping the club, the group finds their car destroyed and Ariel's condition worsens due to blood loss. They decide to get him to a hospital on top of the hill. As they rush to the cable tram station, a tsunami warning is heard. The owner agrees to let only Ariel board the tram car, but a frayed cable breaks, causing the car to plummet to the bottom of the hill, killing everyone on board.

The group heads towards the cemetery through a hidden tunnel after Ariel's tragic death. Along the way, they encounter escaped prisoners looting on the streets. Trying to escape, Gringo gets trapped under a falling building while Monica and Pollo leave to find help. They come across an out-of-control firetruck that crashed due to prisoners attempting to take it over. Monica and Pollo save the living firefighter trapped inside.

While Irina comforts Gringo, Kylie overhears approaching prisoners. Gringo tells the women to hide, but the prisoners threaten him for their location. Irina is captured and raped by the leader while the others sit around joking. Gringo tries to stop the leader and is burned alive in retaliation. Kylie runs away and bumps into Monica and the group, who go back for Irina. Pollo kills the leader's brother, but as they try to escape, the leader returns and kills Irina.

The group finds a gated building with other survivors but a single mother initially refuses to let them in. As they beg, the woman shoots Pollo in the chest. They hide him and go to get help, but one of the prisoners hears Pollo's phone ringing and finds him. They kill Pollo and pursue the others.

The group reaches the cathedral, and the priest saves them by leading them through a secret passage. The cathedral collapses during an aftershock, killing the priest and injuring Kylie. The firefighter who helps Kylie is revealed to be one of the escaped prisoners. Monica finds Kylie's body while the prisoner tries to kill her, but she manages to kill him with an axe during another aftershock. 

Monica finally manages to escape through the tunnel and reaches a beach, but she passes out. When she regains consciousness, she looks behind and sees a massive tsunami barreling towards her.

Cast
 Eli Roth as Gringo
 Andrea Osvárt as Monica
 Ariel Levy as Ariel
 Natasha Yarovenko as Irina
 Nicolás Martínez as Pollo
 Lorenza Izzo as Kylie
 Marcial Tagle as Firefighter
 Ramón Llao as Ramon
 Ignacia Allamand as Guide
 Paz Bascuñán as Pregnant woman
 Matías López as Marito
 Patricio Strahovsky as Priest
 Álvaro López as Jesus
 Dayana Amigo as Bartender
 Eduardo Domínguez as Russell Dazzle
 Gabriela Hernández as Cleaning lady
 Edgardo Bruna as Grumpy operator
 Selena Gomez as VIP Girl
 Cristina Pascual as Kindly woman

Production
The film is directed by Nicolás López and written by López, Eli Roth, and Guillermo Amoedo, from a story by Roth and López. The film was based on true events from the 2010 8.8 earthquake in Chile. It was shot in Chile, in many of the same locations where the destruction took place. The idea came from a conversation with Roth and Lopez in which Lopez described the horrors of not just the earthquake, but the complete chaos and temporary collapse of society in the ensuing hours. The film is distributed by Dimension Films.

Roth raised $2 million in funding from a group of doctors in Buffalo. Distribution rights were presold to recoup the budget costs.

López had previous experience shooting using Digital SLR cameras, and after screen tests, convinced Roth that with the right lenses and lighting it would look like 35mm film. The entire movie was recorded using a Canon EOS 5D camera.

Release
The film initially received a NC-17 rating, and consequently had to be re-edited so that it would achieve an R rating.

Reception

Critical response 

Rotten Tomatoes gives Aftershock a 38% approval rating based on 52 reviews, with an average score of 4.61/10. The site's consensus reads: "Aftershock hints at an inventive twist on horror tropes, but ultimately settles for another round of mind-numbing depravity that may alternately bore and revolt all but the most ardent gore enthusiasts".
Metacritic gives a 39 rating, indicating "generally unfavorable reviews", based on reviews from 20 critics.

Box office 
The film opened at 110 theatres in the United States, and earned $40,179 in its opening weekend.

See also 
 Earthquake (1974)
 2010 Chile earthquake

References

External links
 
 
 
 

2012 films
2012 horror films
2010s disaster films
2012 independent films
2012 horror thriller films
American disaster films
American films based on actual events
American horror thriller films
English-language Chilean films
Disaster films based on actual events
Films set in Chile
Films shot in Chile
Chilean independent films
Chilean horror thriller films
American independent films
Films produced by Brian Oliver
Films produced by Eli Roth
Films with screenplays by Eli Roth
Cross Creek Pictures films
Dimension Films films
2010s English-language films
2010s American films
2010s Chilean films